A gendarmerie is a military force with law enforcement duties among the civilian population. The term gendarme is derived from the medieval French expression , which translates to "rural police" or "men-at-arms" (literally, "armed people"). In France and some Francophone nations, the gendarmerie is a branch of the armed forces that is responsible for internal security in parts of the territory (primarily in rural areas and small towns in the case of France), with additional duties as military police for the armed forces. It was introduced to several other Western European countries during the Napoleonic conquests. In the mid-twentieth century, a number of former French mandates and colonial possessions (such as Lebanon, Syria, the Ivory Coast and the Republic of the Congo) adopted a gendarmerie after independence. A similar concept exists in Eastern Europe in the form of Internal Troops, which are present in many countries of the former Soviet Union and its former allied countries.

Some of the more prominent modern gendarmerie organizations include the French National Gendarmerie, French National Guard, Spanish Civil Guard, the Romanian Jandarmeria, Algerian National Gendarmerie, Argentine National Gendarmerie, United States Constabulary, Burkinese National Gendarmerie, Italian Carabinieri, Chilean Carabineros, Moldovan Carabinieri, Royal Netherlands Marechaussee, the Royal Moroccan Gendarmerie, the Portuguese National Republican Guard, Serbian Žandarmerija, Mexican National Guard, Tunisian National Guard, Turkish Gendarmerie and the Royal Canadian Mounted Police/Gendarmerie royale du Canada.

Etymology 
The word gendarme is a singular extracted from Old French , meaning "men-at-arms". From the Late Middle Ages to the Early Modern period, the term referred to a heavily armoured cavalryman of noble birth, primarily serving in the French army.

Historically, the spelling in English was gendarmery, but now the French spelling gendarmerie is more common. The Oxford English Dictionary (OED) uses gendarmery as the principal spelling, whereas Merriam-Webster uses gendarmerie as the principal spelling.

Title and status 
These forces are normally titled "gendarmerie", but gendarmeries may bear other titles, for instance the Carabinieri in Italy, the Guarda Nacional Republicana in Portugal, the Guardia Civil in Spain, the Royal Marechaussee in the Netherlands or Internal Troops/National Guard in Ukraine and Russia.

As a result of their duties within the civilian population, gendarmeries are sometimes described as "paramilitary" rather than "military" forces (especially in the English-speaking world where policing is rarely associated with military forces) although this description rarely corresponds to their official status and capabilities. Gendarmes are very rarely deployed in military situations, except in humanitarian deployments abroad.

A gendarmerie may come under the authority of a ministry of defence (e.g. Algeria, Netherlands and Poland), a ministry of the interior (e.g. Argentina, Romania, Turkey and Ukraine) or even both ministries at once (e.g. Chile, France, Italy, Portugal and Spain). Generally there is some coordination between ministries of defence and the interior over the use of gendarmes. In addition, some gendarmeries can be part of a civilian police force, such as the Israel Border Police (Magav), which is the gendarmerie branch of the civilian Israel Police.

A few forces which are no longer considered military retain the title "gendarmerie" for reasons of tradition. For instance, the French language title of the Royal Canadian Mounted Police is Gendarmerie royale du Canada (GRC) (i.e., Royal Gendarmerie of Canada) because this force traditionally had some military-style functions (although separate from the Canadian Army) and has retained its status as a regiment of dragoons. The Argentine Gendarmerie is a military force in terms of training, identity and public perception, and was involved in combat in the Falklands War, however it is classified as a "security force" not an "armed force", to exercise jurisdiction over the civilian population under Argentine law.

Since different countries may make different use of institutional terms such as "gendarmerie", there are cases in which the term may become confusing. For instance, in the French-speaking Cantons of Switzerland the "gendarmeries" are the uniformed civil police (see: Gendarmerie (Switzerland)). In Chile, the word "gendarmerie" refers for historic reasons to the prison service (the "Chilean Gendarmerie"), while the actual gendarmerie force is called the "carabineros".

In some cases, a police service's military links are ambiguous and it can be unclear whether a force should be defined as a gendarmerie (e.g. Mexico's Federal Police, Brazil's Military Police, or the former British South Africa Police until 1980). Some historical military units, such as South-West Africa's Koevoet, were only defined as police for political reasons. Services such as the Italian Guardia di Finanza would rarely be defined as gendarmeries since the service is of an ambiguous military status and does not have general policing duties amongst the civilian population. In Russia, the modern National Guard (successor of the Internal Troops) are military units with quasi-police duties but historically, different bodies within the Tsarist Special Corps of Gendarmes performed a variety of functions as an armed rural constabulary, urban riot control units, frontier guards, intelligence agents and political police. Prior to the creation of the Irish Free State in 1922, some policing was based on the Royal Irish Constabulary— initially an armed force located in police barracks, routinely unarmed after the 1880s when most civil unrest had subsided. Some consider this a gendarmerie, although this is tendentious as the subsequent Civic Guard of the Irish Free State were also uniformly armed but not described as a gendarmerie.

In China, after numerous reorganizations and transfers of control between the PLA and the MPS, the People's Armed Police, a gendarmerie services, was created on 19 June 1982. The establishment of the PAP highlighted the efforts to increase the professionalization of the security apparatus, as well as the absorption of numerous PLA demobilized personnel, in the wake of growing unrest.

In 2014 the Mexican Federal Police, a heavily armed force which has many attributes of a gendarmerie, created a new seventh branch of service called the National Gendarmerie Division. The new force would initially number 5,000 personnel and was created with the assistance of the French gendarmerie.

Role and services 

In comparison to civilian police forces, gendarmeries may provide a more disciplined force whose military capabilities (e.g., armoured group in France with armoured personnel carriers) make them more capable of dealing with armed groups and with all types of violence. On the other hand, the necessity of a more stringent selection process for military service, especially in terms of physical prowess and health, restricts the pool of potential recruits in comparison to those from which a civilian police force could select.

The growth and expansion of gendarmerie units worldwide has been linked to an increasing reluctance by some governments to use military units typically entrusted with external defence for combating internal threats. A somewhat related phenomenon has been the formation of paramilitary units which fall under the authority of civilian police agencies. Since these are not strictly military forces, however, they are not considered gendarmerie.

In France, the gendarmerie is in charge of rural areas and small towns (typically less than 10,000 inhabitants) which represent 95% of the territory and close to 50% of the population. Besides its territorial organization, it has crowd and riot control units (the Gendarmerie Mobile, along with some corresponding units in the civilian police), counter-terrorism and hostage rescue (GIGN, again along with some corresponding units in the civilian police), maritime surveillance, police at sea and coast guard (Gendarmerie maritime), control and security at airports and air traffic police (Gendarmerie des transports aériens), official buildings guard, honorary services and protection of the President (Garde Républicaine), mountain rescue (Peloton de Gendarmerie de Haute Montagne) and security of nuclear weapons sites.

French influence 

The use of military organisations to police civilian populations is common to many time periods and cultures. Being a French concept, the French Gendarmerie has been the most influential model for such an organisation.

Many countries that were once under French rule and influence have a gendarmerie. Italy, Belgium and Austria have had gendarmeries through Napoleonic influence for instance but, while Italy still has the Italian equivalent known as the Carabinieri, Belgium and Austria's gendarmeries have merged with the civil police (in, respectively, 2001 and 2005). Many former French colonies, especially in Africa, also have gendarmeries. The Dutch Royal Marechaussee was created by King William I to replace the French Gendarmerie after French rule ended.

The national police force of Canada, the Royal Canadian Mounted Police is referred to in French as the Gendarmerie royale du Canada (GRC). However the RCMP is a mainly civilian organisation within Public Safety Canada. It is not part of the Canadian Department of National Defence, but does have a paramilitary wing and they have been awarded the status of a regiment of dragoons, with a military battle standard displaying their battle honours following service in World War I. Those honours include Northwest Canada, South Africa, The Great War, and the Second World War.

A common gendarmerie symbol is a flaming grenade, first used as insignia by the French force.

Role in modern conflicts 

Gendarmes play an important role re-establishing law and order in conflict areas, a task which is suited to their purpose, training and capabilities. Gendarmeries are widely used for internal security and in peacekeeping operations, for instance in the former Yugoslavia and in Ivory Coast, sometimes via the European Gendarmerie Force.

See also 
 List of gendarmeries
 National Guard
 Carabinier
 Carabinieri
 Constabulary 
 Internal Troops
 Security forces
 Paramilitary
 Militia
 Border guard
 Coast guard
 Militarization of police
 European Gendarmerie Force
 Martial law

References